K-Ras(G12C) inhibitor 6 is an irreversible inhibitor of oncogenic K-Ras(G12C), subverting the native nucleotide preference to favour GDP over GTP. Its family of inhibitors allosterically control GTP affinity and effector interactions by fitting inside a "pocket", or binding site, of mutant K-Ras.

Investigators and pathologists previously thought that K-Ras is undruggable. However, Kevan M. Shokat and his colleagues, in the Howard Hughes Medical Institute (HHMI) at the University of California, recently reported a novel discovery of "Achilles heel" on K-RAs, and believed that it has real translational implications for patients with K-RAs mutation.

References

Thiols
Carboxamides
Piperidines
Chloroarenes